Reti is a 2016 Marathi film. Shaan debuts as a music director for the film.

Plot 

The movie is based on the Sand mafia and highlights the sacrifice of honest Government officers, who prevent the uncontrollable theft of sand, which no government has been able to stop.

Cast 

Chinmay Mandlekar as Shankarya
Suhas Palshikar as Revenue Minister
Kishor Kadam as Kisan
Shashank Shende as Mhatre
Swapnil Rajshekhar as Divisional Officer
Gayatri Soham as Suli
 Sanjay Khapare
Rashmi Rajput
Vidhyadhar Joshi
Deepak Karanjikar
Mosami Tondwalkar
 Bhagyashri Rane
 Pankaj Parakh (Special Appearance)

Soundtrack 
The film remarks the Marathi debut of Shaan as a composer. The soundtrack album contains 3 songs all songs are composed by Superbia.
 Nimut taryache - Shaan, Nihira Joshi
 Bagh Bagh - Apeksha Dandekar
 Reti Theme Song - Shaan

References

2010s Marathi-language films